Hentzia alamosa is a species of jumping spider in the family Salticidae. It is only known from Texas in the United States.

References

Salticidae
Articles created by Qbugbot
Spiders described in 2010